This is a list of the band members associated with English rock musician Blaze Bayley.

Main band 
 Blaze Bayley – vocals (1999–present)
 Chris Appleton – guitars, backing vocals (2014–present)
 Luke Appleton – guitars, backing vocals, bass (2009–2010, 2014, 2018–2019, 2021-present)
 Karl Schramm – bass, backing vocals (2014–present)
 Martin McNee – drums (2014–present)

Former line-ups

Timeline

Other Projects

"Trinity" with Geoff Tate and "Ripper" Owens 

From 2016, Blaze joined former Queensryche singer Geoff Tate and former Judas Priest vocalist Tim Owens in the touring project "Trinity"
 Blaze Bayley – vocals
 Kelly Gray - Guitars
 Scott Moughton - Guitars
 Tim Fernley - Bass
 Scott Mercado - Drums

"Metal Singers" with Udo, "Ripper" Owens and Mike Vescera 
In 2015 the four singer toured South America together

 Blaze Bayley – vocals
 Lely Biscasse - Guitars
 Raphael Gazal - Guitars
 Lennon Biscasse - Bass
 Guto Franceschet - Drums

Bayley vs Di'Anno 

From 2012, former Iron Maiden singers Blaze Bayley and Paul Di'Anno started a partnership doing some co-headlining tours and sharing the same roster of musicians.

- Russian Federation and occasionally Scandinavia:

 Blaze Bayley – vocals
 Andrey Smirnov
 Vladimir Litsov – guitars
 Ilya Mamontov – guitars
 Nikolay Korshunov – bass 
 Andrey Ischenko – drums
 Sergey Serbrennikov – drums

- For their Australia/New Zealand tour Bayley and Di'Anno shared Australian musicians:
 Blaze Bayley – vocals
 Doug Dalton – guitars
 Jimmy Lardner-Brown – guitars
 Stu Tyrrell – bass
 Dom Simpson – drums

- For the Scandinavian gigs and occasionally Great Britain:
 Blaze Bayley – vocals
 Richie Nielsen – guitars
 John V – guitars
 Are Gogstad – bass
 Rick Hagan – drums

- For some Italian and French gigs the two singers have been backed by official Iron Maiden tribute band Children of the Damned from Italy:

 Blaze Bayley – vocals
 Carlo Micheletti – guitars
 Andrea Moretti – guitars
 Francesco Bevini – guitars
 Matteo Panzavolta – bass
 Gianluca Calanca – drums

Metal vs Blues 

In 2015 Blaze started a cooperation with US-Italian band Twin Dragons with the shows "Metal vs Blues Rock", with these musicians:

 Blaze Bayleyy - vocals
 Nazzareno Zacconi - guitars
 Don Roxx - guitars
 Fabio Cerrone - bass
 Manuel Togni - drums

North America 

- Starting from 2013 Bayley hit the stage for brief US tours with an all star project named The Foundry, involving members of Disturbed, Adrenaline Mob, Danzig, Black Simphony, Scorpions, Fates Warning and Twisted Sisters:

 Blaze Bayley – vocals 
 Rick Plester – guitars
 John Moyer – bass
 Bobby Jarzombek - drums
 (James Kottak – drums 2013) 
 (A.J. Pero – drums 2014-2015)
 (Shawn Austin – guest on vocals 2013)

- In Mexico 2016 he has been backed by metal band Overfire:

 Blaze Bayley – vocals 
 Paco Lorenzana - guitars
Adrián Toussaint - guitars
 Eduardo Mandujano - bass
 Miky Estrada - drums

- In Canadian Tour of September 2016 his musicians were from bands Insurgent Inc and Maiden Québec.

 Blaze Bayley - vocals
 Luis-Alberto Sanchez - guitars 
 Leandro Alves - guitars
 Math Gagnon - bass
 Olivier Forest - drums

- In Canadian tour of October 2014 he was backed by Maiden Québec:

 Blaze Bayley – vocals 
 Steven Bergeron – guitars
 Leandro Alves – guitars
 Math Gagnon – bass
 Jef Rastoldo – drums

- In the US tour of 2011 the singer performed with the following band:

 Blaze Bayley – vocals 
 Rick Plester – guitars
 M.G. Jones – guitars
 Matt Maclean – bass 
 Bill Legue – drums
 (Chris Declercq – guest on guitars)

South America 

- In most of South American tours Blaze (initially with Zwijsen) has been backed by musicians of "The Best Maiden Tribute" and Tailgunners from Brazil:

 Blaze Bayley – vocals
 Thomas Zwijsen – guitars
 Lely Biscasse – guitars
 Raphael Gazal – guitars
 Lennon Biscasse – bass
 Guto Franceschet – drums

- In Argentina 2016 he used two different bands:
 Blaze Bayley - vocals
 Diego Lombardo - guitars
 Emiliano Bracamonte - guitars
 Salvador Sauan - bass
 Eric Flägel - drums
 Blaze Bayley - vocals
 German Catelli - guitars
 Damian Nahuel Ros - guitars
 Julian Chuña Acuña Chapczuk - bass 
 Cristian Cuppari - drums

- In Colombia 2016 with the band ADS:
 Blaze Bayley - vocals
 Adrian Dark Storm - guitars
 Jose Alfredo García - guitars
 Daniel Mantilla - bass
 Alejandro Rueda - drums

- In Chle 2016 has been backed by the band Genghis Khan: 
 Blaze Bayley- vocals
 Diego Garcia - guitars
 Ivàn Moya - guitars
 Felipe Duràn - bass
 Carlos Osorio - drums

Unplugged 

- For acoustic touring Blaze recently involved those musicians:

 Thomas Zwijsen – guitars
 Anne Bakker – violin 
 Michelle Sciarrotta – guitars 
 Olivier Arpin and Stephan Laroche – guitars 
 Andrea Neri – guitars 
 Jase Edwards – guitars 
 Nazzareno Zacconi - guitars

Occasional 

- In September 2014, celebrating 20 years after joining Iron Maiden, he toured with a special set with this band from Slovakia:

 Blaze Bayley – vocals
 Juro Gasinec – guitars
 Tibor Buso – guitars
 Jan Kicin – bass
 Lubo Franek – drums

- For the Italian summer tour of 2011, soon after the dissolution of Blaze Bayley Band, the singer has occasionally performed with the following lineup:

 Blaze Bayley – vocals
 Andrea Neri – guitars
 Lorenzo Carancini – guitars
 Simone Massimi – bass
 Roberto Pirami – drums
  
- In March 2013 for a charity gig in Redhill (Uk) the line-up has been:

 Blaze Bayley – vocals
 James Cornford – guitars
 Pete Welsh – guitars
 Jim Houghton – bass
 Rai Whisker – drums

- In one festival in France of 2012 Neil, bandmate of Lehmann in Neurasthenia, has performed on guitars as stand-in for Andrea Neri

- Bayley occasionally performed full shows with the bands Seven (Czech Republic), Trooper (Romania), John Steel (Bulgaria), Hammerheart (Slovakia), Apsent (Turkey, first gig ever after the dissolution of Blaze Bayley Band), Lunar Explosion and Flash of The Blade (Italy)

References 

Lists of musicians